The Canton of Toulouges is a French former canton of Pyrénées-Orientales department, in Languedoc-Roussillon. It had 15,863 inhabitants (2012). It was disbanded following the French canton reorganisation which came into effect in March 2015.

Composition
The canton of Toulouges comprised 3 communes:
Toulouges
Canohès
Pollestres

References

Toulouges
2015 disestablishments in France
States and territories disestablished in 2015